Towersey Halt railway station was an intermediate station on the Wycombe Railway which served the Oxfordshire village of Towersey from 1933 to 1963. The opening of the halt was part of an attempt by the Great Western Railway to encourage more passengers on the line at a time when competition from bus services was drawing away patronage. The possibility of reopening the line through Towersey Halt, which is now part of a long-distance footpath, has been explored by Chiltern Railways, the franchise holder for the Chiltern Main Line which runs through .

History
By 1933, passenger numbers were dropping as a result of increased bus competition which led the Great Western Railway to introduce railmotors as an economy measure between Princes Risborough and Thame. A wooden halt was also opened to the south of the small village of Towersey on the up side of an embankment on the western side of a level crossing spanning the Thame - Towersey - Chinnor road. As with similar GWR structures, Towersey Halt had very basic facilities: a small wooden pagoda-style passenger waiting shelter, two oil lamps and a running in board showing the station's name on both sides. To the east of the halt, Penn Farm had its own siding from the line's opening until 1939.

On the basis of an estimated saving of £34,372, passenger services were withdrawn between Oxford and Princes Risborough from January 1963. However, the track remained in use down to handle oil trains serving the BP depot at Thame. The depot finally closed in October 1991 and the track was dismantled.

Present day 
Nothing remains of the halt, but the trackbed running through it has been incorporated into the Phoenix Trail, a long-distance footpath and cycleway.

As part of its preparations for its bid to run the Chiltern Railways franchise, Chiltern Railways announced in 2000 that it was looking into the possibility of reinstating passenger services on the line between Oxford and Risborough, the cost of which it estimated at £250m. It was decided instead to build a  link between the Oxford to Bicester Line and the Chiltern Main Line in order to run through services between Oxford and London via High Wycombe.

References

Sources

External links 
 Station on navigable 1946 O.S. map

Disused railway stations in Oxfordshire
Former Great Western Railway stations
Railway stations in Great Britain opened in 1933
Railway stations in Great Britain closed in 1963
1933 establishments in England